Ilderton railway station served the village of Ilderton, Northumberland, England from 1887 to 1953 on the Cornhill Branch.

History 
The station opened on 5 September 1887 by the North Eastern Railway. It was situated on the west side of the A697. There were a wide range of buildings (as well as the station building), namely a stone warehouse, coal and lime drops, an office and livestock loading facilities. As well as having these facilities, there were five sidings, one serving the goods shed and three serving a goods platform. In 1911, the station sold 4,279 tickets with the population of the local village being 1,252. The station closed to passengers on 22 September 1930 and to goods traffic on 2 March 1953.

References

External links 

Disused railway stations in Northumberland
Former North Eastern Railway (UK) stations
Railway stations in Great Britain opened in 1887
Railway stations in Great Britain closed in 1930
1887 establishments in England
1953 disestablishments in England